Darkvision is a fantasy novel by Bruce Cordell, set in the world of the Forgotten Realms, and based on the Dungeons & Dragons role-playing game. It is the third novel in "The Wizards" series. It was published in paperback in September 2006.

Plot summary
Darkvision is a novel in which the sorceress Ususi runs away to the outside world that her people abandoned long ago, in search of relics they once possessed.

Reception
Pat Ferrara of mania.com comments: "Another stand-alone novel of The Wizards series, Darkvision hits the scene under the experienced wing of Forgotten Realms guru Bruce R. Cordell."

References

2006 American novels
Forgotten Realms novels
Novels by Bruce Cordell